Offenburg is an electoral constituency (German: Wahlkreis) represented in the Bundestag. It elects one member via first-past-the-post voting. Under the current constituency numbering system, it is designated as constituency 284. It is located in western Baden-Württemberg, comprising the northern part of the Ortenaukreis district.

Offenburg was created for the inaugural 1949 federal election. Since 1972, it has been represented by Wolfgang Schäuble of the Christian Democratic Union (CDU).

Geography
Offenburg is located in western Baden-Württemberg. As of the 2021 federal election, it comprises the Ortenaukreis district excluding the municipalities of Ettenheim, Fischerbach, Friesenheim, Haslach im Kinzigtal, Hofstetten, Kappel-Grafenhausen, Kippenheim, Lahr/Schwarzwald, Mahlberg, Meißenheim, Mühlenbach, Ringsheim, Rust, Schuttertal, Schwanau, Seelbach, Steinach, Gutach (Schwarzwaldbahn), Hausach, Hornberg, Oberwolfach, and Wolfach.

History
Offenburg was created in 1949. In the 1949 election, it was Baden constituency 6 in the numbering system. In the 1953 through 1961 elections, it was number 188. In the 1965 through 1976 elections, it was number 192. In the 1980 through 1998 elections, it was number 188. In the 2002 and 2005 elections, it was number 285. Since the 2009 election, it has been number 284.

Originally, the constituency comprised the districts of Offenburg, Lahr, and Kehl. It acquired its current borders in the 1980 election.

Members
The constituency has been held continuously by Christian Democratic Union (CDU) since its creation. It was first represented by Oskar Rümmele from 1949 to 1957, followed by Hans Furler from 1957 to 1972. Since 1972, it has been represented by Wolfgang Schäuble. Schäuble has served fourteen consecutive terms as representative over the course of 49 years, making him the longest-serving parliamentarian in German history.

Election results

2021 election

2017 election

2013 election

2009 election

References

Federal electoral districts in Baden-Württemberg
1949 establishments in West Germany
Constituencies established in 1949
Ortenaukreis